HardBall IV is a video game developed by MindSpan and published by Accolade for the Sega Genesis as HardBall '94 and later for DOS.

Gameplay
HardBall IV is a baseball game featuring Super VGA graphics.

Release 
A port of HardBall IV for the Atari Jaguar was in development by High Voltage Software, but it was never released.

Reception
Next Generation reviewed the PC version of the game, rating it four stars out of five, and stated that "you've got a top-notch simulation of America's favorite sport."

Notes

References

External links 
 HardBall IV at GameFAQs
 HardBall IV at MobyGames

1994 video games
Accolade (company) games
Baseball video games
Cancelled Atari Jaguar games
DOS games
HardBall!
Multiplayer and single-player video games
Sega Genesis games
Video games developed in the United States